Programmed death-ligand 1 (PD-L1) also known as cluster of differentiation 274 (CD274) or B7 homolog 1 (B7-H1) is a protein that in humans is encoded by the CD274 gene.

Programmed death-ligand 1 (PD-L1) is a 40kDa type 1 transmembrane protein that has been speculated to play a major role in suppressing the adaptive arm of immune systems during particular events such as pregnancy, tissue allografts, autoimmune disease and other disease states such as hepatitis. Normally the adaptive immune system reacts to antigens that are associated with immune system activation by exogenous or endogenous danger signals. In turn, clonal expansion of  antigen-specific CD8+ T cells and/or CD4+ helper cells is propagated. The binding of PD-L1 to the inhibitory checkpoint molecule PD-1 transmits an inhibitory signal based on interaction with phosphatases (SHP-1 or SHP-2) via Immunoreceptor Tyrosine-Based Switch Motif (ITSM). This reduces the proliferation of antigen-specific T-cells in lymph nodes, while simultaneously reducing apoptosis in regulatory T cells (anti-inflammatory, suppressive T cells) - further mediated by a lower regulation of the gene Bcl-2.

History 
PD-L1 was characterized at the Mayo Clinic as an immune regulatory molecule, B7-H1  . Later,  this molecule was renamed as PD-L1 because it was identified as a ligand of PD-1 Several human cancer cells expressed high levels of B7-H1, and blockade of B7-H1 reduced the growth of tumors in the presence of immune cells. At that time, it was concluded that B7-H1 helps tumor cells evade anti-tumor immunity. In 2003, B7-H1 was shown to be expressed on Myeloid cells as checkpoint protein and was proposed as potential target in cancer immunotherapy in human clinic.

Binding

PD-L1 binds to its receptor, PD-1, found on activated T cells, B cells, and myeloid cells, to modulate activation or inhibition. The affinity between PD-L1 and PD-1, as defined by the dissociation constant Kd, is 770 nM. PD-L1 also has an appreciable affinity for the costimulatory molecule CD80 (B7-1), but not CD86 (B7-2). CD80's affinity for PD-L1, 1.4 µM, is intermediate between its affinity for CD28 and CTLA-4 (4.0 µM and 400 nM, respectively). The related molecule PD-L2 has no such affinity for CD80 or CD86, but shares PD-1 as a receptor (with a stronger Kd of 140 nM).
Said et al. showed that PD-1, up-regulated on activated CD4 T-cells, can bind to PD-L1 expressed on monocytes and induces IL-10 production by the latter.

Signaling
Engagement of PD-L1 with its receptor PD-1 on T cells delivers a signal that inhibits TCR-mediated activation of IL-2 production and T cell proliferation. The mechanism involves inhibition of ZAP70 phosphorylation and its association with CD3ζ. PD-1 signaling attenuates PKC-θ activation loop phosphorylation (resulting from TCR signaling), necessary for the activation of transcription factors NF-κB and AP-1, and for production of IL-2. PD-L1 binding to PD-1 also contributes to ligand-induced TCR down-modulation during antigen presentation to naive T cells, by inducing the up-regulation of the E3 ubiquitin ligase CBL-b.

Regulation

By interferons
Upon IFN-γ stimulation, PD-L1 is expressed on T cells, NK cells, macrophages, myeloid DCs, B cells, epithelial cells, and vascular endothelial cells. The PD-L1 gene promoter region has a response element to IRF-1, the interferon regulatory factor. Type I interferons can also upregulate PD-L1 on murine hepatocytes, monocytes, DCs, and tumor cells.

On macrophages and monocytes
PD-L1 is notably expressed on macrophages. In the mouse, it has been shown that classically activated macrophages (induced by type I helper T cells or a combination of LPS and interferon-gamma) greatly upregulate PD-L1. Alternatively, macrophages activated by IL-4 (alternative macrophages), slightly upregulate PD-L1, while greatly upregulating PD-L2. It has been shown by STAT1-deficient knock-out mice that STAT1 is mostly responsible for upregulation of PD-L1 on macrophages by LPS or interferon-gamma, but is not at all responsible for its constitutive expression before activation in these mice.
It was also shown that PD-L1 is constituvely expressed on mouse Ly6Clo nonclassical monocytes in steady state.

Role of microRNAs
Resting human cholangiocytes express PD-L1 mRNA, but not the protein, due to translational suppression by microRNA miR-513. Upon treatment with interferon-gamma, miR-513 was down-regulated, thereby lifting suppression of PD-L1 protein. In this way, interferon-gamma can induce PD-L1 protein expression by inhibiting gene-mediated suppression of mRNA translation. Whereas the Epstein-Barr viral (EBV) latent membrane protein-1 (LMP1) is a known potent inducer of PD-L1, the EBV miRNA miR-BamH1 fragment H rightward open reading frame 1 (BHRF1) 2-5p has been shown to regulate LMP1 induced PD-L1 expression.

Epigenetic regulation
PD-L1 promoter DNA methylation may predict survival in some cancers after surgery.

Clinical significance

Cancer 

PD-L1 is shown to be highly expressed in a variety of malignancies, particularly lung cancer. In order to anticipate the effectiveness of gene therapy or systemic immunotherapy in blocking the PD-1 and PD-L1 checkpoints, PD-L1 might be employed as a prognostic marker and a target for anti-cancer immunity. i.e. upregulation of PD-L1 may allow cancers to evade the host immune system. For example, an analysis of 196 tumor specimens from patients with renal cell carcinoma found that high tumor expression of PD-L1 was associated with increased tumor aggressiveness and a 4.5-fold increased risk of death.
Many PD-L1 inhibitors are in development as immuno-oncology therapies and are showing good results in clinical trials. Clinically available examples include durvalumab, atezolizumab and avelumab.
In normal tissue, feedback between transcription factors like STAT3 and NF-κB restricts the immune response to protect host tissue and limit inflammation. In cancer, loss of feedback restriction between transcription factors can lead to increased local PD-L1 expression, which could limit the effectiveness of systemic treatment with agents targeting PD-L1.
 CAR-T and NK cells targeting PD-L1 are being evaluated for treating cancer.  pSTAT-1 and PDL-1 expressions also strongly correlate in prostate cancer.

Upregulation of PD-L1 on immune cells (especially myeloid cells) can also lead to formation of an immunosuppressive environment in a highly localized manner that also allow the cancer cells to proliferate.

PD-L1 analysis in TNBC is essential for selecting patients eligible for immunotherapy. Inter-observer and intra-observer agreement among the pathologists were found to be substantial. Cases around the 1% cut-off value are specifically challenging.

Listeria monocytogenes 
In a mouse model of intracellular infection, L. monocytogenes induced PD-L1 protein expression in T cells, NK cells, and macrophages. PD-L1 blockade (using blocking antibodies) resulted in increased mortality for infected mice. Blockade reduced TNFα and nitric oxide production by macrophages, reduced granzyme B production by NK cells, and decreased proliferation of L. monocytogenes antigen-specific CD8 T cells (but not CD4 T cells). This evidence suggests that PD-L1 acts as a positive costimulatory molecule in intracellular infection.

Autoimmunity 
PD-1/PD-L1 interaction is thought to play a role in preventing destructive autoimmunity, especially during inflammatory conditions. The best example is in the stomach, where PD-1 expression protects the gastrin expressing G-cells from the immune system during Helicobacter pylori-provoked inflammation. But also a variety of pre-clinical studies support the notion that the PD-1/PD-L1 interaction is implicated in autoimmunity. NOD mice, an animal model for autoimmunity that exhibit a susceptibility to spontaneous development of type I diabetes and other autoimmune diseases, have been shown to develop precipitated onset of diabetes from blockade of PD-1 or PD-L1 (but not PD-L2).

In humans, PD-L1 was found to have altered expression in pediatric patients with systemic lupus erythematosus (SLE). Studying isolated PBMC from healthy children, immature myeloid dendritic cells and monocytes expressed little PD-L1 at initial isolation, but spontaneously up-regulated PD-L1 by 24 hours. In contrast, both mDC and monocytes from patients with active SLE failed to upregulate PD-L1 over a 5-day time course, expressing this protein only during disease remissions. This may be one mechanism whereby peripheral tolerance is lost in SLE.

See also 
 Cluster of differentiation
 Co-stimulation
 Immune tolerance

References

External links 
 
 

Clusters of differentiation